Xujingbeicheng is a station on Line 17 of the Shanghai Metro. This station opened with the rest of Line 17 on 30 December 2017.

History 
The station opened for passenger trial operation on 30 December 2017, concurrent with the opening of the rest of Line 17.

Description 

The station is located at the intersection of Songze Avenue and Xule Road, in the Qingpu District of Shanghai. An elevated station, the station consists of two floors. At street level are the exits and the concourse of the station, with fare gates, ticket machines, and a customer service counter. The platforms are located one level above. Toilets are available at the east end of the platform within the fare-paid zone.

Like all stations on Line 17, the station is fully accessible. An elevator connects the concourse to the platform within the fare-paid zone.

Exits 
The station has three exits:
 Exit 1: Songze Avenue, Xule Road
 Exit 2: Songze Avenue
 Exit 3: Xule Road

Metro infrastructure in the vicinity 

References 

Railway stations in Shanghai
Shanghai Metro stations in Qingpu District
Railway stations in China opened in 2017
Line 17, Shanghai Metro